Yuraq Punta (Quechua yuraq white, punta peak; ridge, "white peak (or ridge)", also spelled Yuracpunta) is a mountain in the Andes of Peru which reaches a height of approximately . It is located in the Ancash Region, Bolognesi Province, Cajacay District, and in the Ocros Province, Cajamarquilla District.

References

Mountains of Peru
Mountains of Ancash Region